Necton Darlington Mhura (1957 – February 19, 2018) was a Malawian academic, diplomat and politician. He served as Malawi's Ambassador to the United States, with dual accreditation to Canada and Mexico, from May 2015 to September 2016 and the Permanent Representative of Malawi to the United Nations from 2016 until his death in office on February 19, 2018.

Biography
Mhura received his Bachelor of Laws from the University of Malawi and his Master of Laws from the University of London. He joined the University of Edinburgh as a research fellow from 1985 until 1988.

Career
Mhura taught as a law lecturer at Malawi Polytechnic from 1995 until 1998. He then served as the head of department of law at the University of Malawi from 1996 until 2002, acting Dean of the university from 1997 until 2000, and Dean of the Faculty of Law at University of Malawi, Chancellor College, from 2004 until 2007.

He was appointed as the national Commissioner of Lands for the Malawi's Ministry of Lands, Housing and Urban Development from 2009 to 2010 and the Deputy Chief Secretary to the Government of Malawi from 2010 until 2012. He practiced law from 2012 until 2015, when he was appointed Ambassador to the United States.

Ambassador to the United States
Necton Mhura served as Ambassador to the United States from May 2015 until September 2016. He concurrently served as the non-resident High Commissioner to Canada and the Bahamas, as well as the non-resident Ambassador to Cuba and Mexico. He was appointed Ambassador to the United States on May 18, 2015.

Permanent Representative to the United Nations
In September 2016, Mhura was appointed Permanent Representative of Malawi to the United Nations. He presented his credentials to United Nations Secretary-General Ban Ki-moon on September 9, 2016. He remained in the position until his death on February 19, 2018.

Necton Mhura died of complications from cancer at Robert Wood Johnson University Hospital in New Brunswick, New Jersey, on February 19, 2018, at the age of 61. He was survived by his wife and three children. A memorial service was held in Yonkers, New York, before his body was flown to Malawi. Mhura was buried in the city of Zomba, Malawi, on March 1, 2018.

References

1957 births
2018 deaths
Academic staff of the University of Malawi
Permanent Representatives of Malawi to the United Nations
Ambassadors of Malawi to the United States
High Commissioners of Malawi to Canada
Ambassadors of Malawi to Mexico
High Commissioners of Malawi to the Bahamas
Ambassadors of Malawi to Cuba
Government ministers of Malawi
University of Malawi alumni
Alumni of the University of London
People from Zomba District